The Long Tomorrow is the title of a science fiction comics short story serialized in two segments in the French magazine Metal Hurlant in 1976. It was written by Dan O'Bannon, and illustrated by Moebius. It is noted for its influential visual design, which inspired the designs of feature films including Blade Runner,  Tron, Alien, and The Abyss. The story was reprinted in Moebius Book Four.

Background
In his introduction to the French hardcover graphic story collection The Long Tomorrow, Moebius wrote:

The storytelling of The Long Tomorrow is inspired by film noir and hardboiled crime fiction, but the story is set in a distant, science fiction future, making it one of the first true cyberpunk stories. Pioneering cyberpunk author William Gibson said of The Long Tomorrow:"So it's entirely fair to say, and I've said it before, that the way Neuromancer-the-novel 'looks' was influenced in large part by some of the artwork I saw in Heavy Metal. I assume that this must also be true of John Carpenter's Escape from New York, Ridley Scott's Blade Runner, and all other artifacts of the style sometimes dubbed 'cyberpunk'. Those French guys, they got their end in early".

It was originally serialized in two segments in the French magazine Metal Hurlant in 1976 and later by the American magazine Heavy Metal in Vol. 1 No. 4 and Vol. 1 No. 5, which were published in July and August 1977, respectively.

Influence
The comic's artwork was influential on the concept designs used in subsequent science fiction works, including the 1979 film Alien, the 1982 film Blade Runner, and the 1989 film The Abyss.

References

External links 
 Heavy Metal magazine

French comic strips
1975 comics debuts
Cyberpunk comics
Neo-noir comics
Science fiction comics
Blade Runner (franchise)